Huang Zihao (born 9 June 2001) is a Chinese footballer currently playing as a goalkeeper for Nanjing City.

Career statistics

Club
.

Notes

References

2001 births
Living people
Chinese footballers
China youth international footballers
Association football goalkeepers
China League One players
Jiangsu F.C. players